The Alco DL531, also known as the RSD8 is a model of railway locomotive manufactured and operated in various countries.

A total of 212 were manufactured in Australia between 1959 and 1970 by that country's American Locomotive Company licensee AE Goodwin, Auburn.

The New South Wales Government Railways purchased 165 48 class between 1959 and 1970. They were the largest class of diesel locomotives purchased and operated services on all lines in New South Wales.

The South Australian Railways 830 class were purchased in batches between 1959 and 1970 and operated services throughout South Australia on the narrow, standard and broad gauge lines. In the early 1980s some were transferred to AN Tasrail.

The Silverton Rail purchased three narrow gauge examples for use on the Silverton Tramway line around Broken Hill.

Mass withdrawals began in the 1990s but as at February 2014 about 90 remained in use.

DL531s also operated in Brazil, Pakistan and Peru. A Bo-Bo variant, the DL532, operated in Jamaica and South Korea.

References

See also
New South Wales 48 class locomotive
South Australian Railways 830 class
Silverton Tramway 48s class

ALCO locomotives